Yingjing County is a county in the west-central part of Sichuan Province, China. It is under the administration of Ya'an city.

Climate

References

 
County-level divisions of Sichuan
Ya'an